Degenerate matter is a highly dense state of fermionic matter in which the Pauli exclusion principle exerts significant pressure in addition to, or in lieu of, thermal pressure. The description applies to matter composed of electrons, protons, neutrons or other fermions. The term is mainly used in astrophysics to refer to dense stellar objects where gravitational pressure is so extreme that quantum mechanical effects are significant. This type of matter is naturally found in stars in their final evolutionary states, such as white dwarfs and neutron stars, where thermal pressure alone is not enough to avoid gravitational collapse.

Degenerate matter is usually modelled as an ideal Fermi gas, an ensemble of non-interacting fermions. In a quantum mechanical description, particles limited to a finite volume may take only a discrete set of energies, called quantum states. The Pauli exclusion principle prevents identical fermions from occupying the same quantum state. At lowest total energy (when the thermal energy of the particles is negligible), all the lowest energy quantum states are filled. This state is referred to as full degeneracy. This degeneracy pressure remains non-zero even at absolute zero temperature. Adding particles or reducing the volume forces the particles into higher-energy quantum states. In this situation, a compression force is required, and is made manifest as a resisting pressure. The key feature is that this degeneracy pressure does not depend on the temperature but only on the density of the fermions. Degeneracy pressure keeps dense stars in equilibrium, independent of the thermal structure of the star.

A degenerate mass whose fermions have velocities close to the speed of light (particle kinetic energy larger than its rest mass energy) is called relativistic degenerate matter.

The concept of degenerate stars, stellar objects composed of degenerate matter, was originally developed in a joint effort between Arthur Eddington, Ralph Fowler and Arthur Milne. Eddington had suggested that the atoms in Sirius B were almost completely ionised and closely packed. Fowler described white dwarfs as composed of a gas of particles that became degenerate at low temperature. Milne proposed that degenerate matter is found in most of the nuclei of stars, not only in compact stars.

Concept

If a plasma is cooled and under increasing pressure, it will eventually not be possible to compress the plasma any further. This constraint is due to the Pauli exclusion principle, which states that two fermions cannot share the same quantum state. When in this highly compressed state, since there is no extra space for any particles, a particle's location is extremely defined. Since the locations of the particles of a highly compressed plasma have very low uncertainty, their momentum is extremely uncertain. The Heisenberg uncertainty principle states 

where Δp is the uncertainty in the particle's momentum and Δx is the uncertainty in position (and ħ is the reduced Planck constant).  Therefore, even though the plasma is cold, such particles must on average be moving very fast. Large kinetic energies lead to the conclusion that, in order to compress an object into a very small space, tremendous force is required to control its particles' momentum.

Unlike a classical ideal gas, whose pressure is proportional to its temperature

where P is pressure, kB is Boltzmann's constant, N is the number of particles—typically atoms or molecules—, T is temperature, and  V is the volume, the pressure exerted by degenerate matter depends only weakly on its temperature. In particular, the pressure remains nonzero even at absolute zero temperature. At relatively low densities, the pressure of a fully degenerate gas can be derived by treating the system as an ideal Fermi gas, in this way

where m is the mass of the individual particles making up the gas. At very high densities, where most of the particles are forced into quantum states with relativistic energies, the pressure is given by

where K is another proportionality constant depending on the properties of the particles making up the gas.

All matter experiences both normal thermal pressure and degeneracy pressure, but in commonly encountered gases, thermal pressure dominates so much that degeneracy pressure can be ignored. Likewise, degenerate matter still has normal thermal pressure, the degeneracy pressure dominates to the point that temperature has a negligible effect on the total pressure. The adjacent figure shows how the pressure of a Fermi gas saturates as it is cooled down, relative to a classical ideal gas.

While degeneracy pressure usually dominates at extremely high densities, it is the ratio between degenerate pressure and thermal pressure which determines degeneracy.  Given a sufficiently drastic increase in temperature (such as during a red giant star's helium flash), matter can become non-degenerate without reducing its density.

Degeneracy pressure contributes to the pressure of conventional solids, but these are not usually considered to be degenerate matter because a significant contribution to their pressure is provided by electrical repulsion of atomic nuclei and the screening of nuclei from each other by electrons.  The free electron model of metals derives their physical properties by considering the conduction electrons alone as a degenerate gas, while the majority of the electrons are regarded as occupying bound quantum states. This solid state contrasts with degenerate matter that forms the body of a white dwarf, where most of the electrons would be treated as occupying free particle momentum states.

Exotic examples of degenerate matter include neutron degenerate matter, strange matter, metallic hydrogen and white dwarf matter.

Degenerate gases 
Degenerate gases are gases composed of fermions such as electrons, protons, and neutrons rather than molecules of ordinary matter. The electron gas in ordinary metals and in the interior of white dwarfs are two examples. Following the Pauli exclusion principle, there can be only one fermion occupying each quantum state. In a degenerate gas, all quantum states are filled up to the Fermi energy. Most stars are supported against their own gravitation by normal thermal gas pressure, while in white dwarf stars the supporting force comes from the degeneracy pressure of the electron gas in their interior. In neutron stars, the degenerate particles are neutrons.

A fermion gas in which all quantum states below a given energy level are filled is called a fully degenerate fermion gas. The difference between this energy level and the lowest energy level is known as the Fermi energy.

Electron degeneracy 

In an ordinary fermion gas in which thermal effects dominate, most of the available electron energy levels are unfilled and the electrons are free to move to these states. As particle density is increased, electrons progressively fill the lower energy states and additional electrons are forced to occupy states of higher energy even at low temperatures. Degenerate gases strongly resist further compression because the electrons cannot move to already filled lower energy levels due to the Pauli exclusion principle. Since electrons cannot give up energy by moving to lower energy states, no thermal energy can be extracted. The momentum of the fermions in the fermion gas nevertheless generates pressure, termed "degeneracy pressure".

Under high densities matter becomes a degenerate gas when all electrons are stripped from their parent atoms. The core of a star, once hydrogen burning in nuclear fusion reactions stops, becomes a collection of positively charged ions, largely helium and carbon nuclei, floating in a sea of electrons, which have been stripped from the nuclei. Degenerate gas is an almost perfect conductor of heat and does not obey ordinary gas laws. White dwarfs are luminous not because they are generating energy but rather because they have trapped a large amount of heat which is gradually radiated away. Normal gas exerts higher pressure when it is heated and expands, but the pressure in a degenerate gas does not depend on the temperature. When gas becomes super-compressed, particles position right up against each other to produce degenerate gas that behaves more like a solid. In degenerate gases the kinetic energies of electrons are quite high and the rate of collision between electrons and other particles is quite low, therefore degenerate electrons can travel great distances at velocities that approach the speed of light. Instead of temperature, the pressure in a degenerate gas depends only on the speed of the degenerate particles; however, adding heat does not increase the speed of most of the electrons, because they are stuck in fully occupied quantum states. Pressure is increased only by the mass of the particles, which increases the gravitational force pulling the particles closer together. Therefore, the phenomenon is the opposite of that normally found in matter where if the mass of the matter is increased, the object becomes bigger. In degenerate gas, when the mass is increased,  the particles become spaced closer together due to gravity (and the pressure is increased), so the object becomes smaller. Degenerate gas can be compressed to very high densities, typical values being in the range of 10,000 kilograms per cubic centimeter.

There is an upper limit to the mass of an electron-degenerate object, the Chandrasekhar limit, beyond which electron degeneracy pressure cannot support the object against collapse. The limit is approximately 1.44 solar masses for objects with typical compositions expected for white dwarf stars (carbon and oxygen with two baryons per electron). This mass cutoff is appropriate only for a star supported by ideal electron degeneracy pressure under Newtonian gravity; in general relativity and with realistic Coulomb corrections, the corresponding mass limit is around 1.38 solar masses. The limit may also change with the chemical composition of the object, as it affects the ratio of mass to number of electrons present. The object's rotation, which counteracts the gravitational force, also changes the limit for any particular object. Celestial objects below this limit are white dwarf stars, formed by the gradual shrinking of the cores of stars that run out of fuel. During this shrinking, an electron-degenerate gas forms in the core, providing sufficient degeneracy pressure as it is compressed to resist further collapse. Above this mass limit, a neutron star (primarily supported by neutron degeneracy pressure) or a black hole may be formed instead.

Neutron degeneracy  

Neutron degeneracy is analogous to electron degeneracy and is demonstrated in neutron stars, which are partially supported by the pressure from a degenerate neutron gas. The collapse happens when the core of a white dwarf exceeds approximately 1.44 solar masses, which is the Chandrasekhar limit, above which the collapse is not halted by the pressure of degenerate electrons. As the star collapses, the Fermi energy of the electrons increases to the point where it is energetically favorable for them to combine with protons to produce neutrons (via inverse beta decay, also termed electron capture). The result is an extremely compact star composed of nuclear matter, which is predominantly a degenerate neutron gas, sometimes called neutronium, with a small admixture of degenerate proton and electron gases.

Neutrons in a degenerate neutron gas are spaced much more closely than electrons in an electron-degenerate gas because the more massive neutron has a much shorter wavelength at a given energy. In the case of neutron stars and white dwarfs, this phenomenon is compounded by the fact that the pressures within neutron stars are much higher than those in white dwarfs. The pressure increase is caused by the fact that the compactness of a neutron star causes gravitational forces to be much higher than in a less compact body with similar mass. The result is a star with a diameter on the order of a thousandth that of a white dwarf.

There is an upper limit to the mass of a neutron-degenerate object, the Tolman–Oppenheimer–Volkoff limit, which is analogous to the Chandrasekhar limit for electron-degenerate objects. The theoretical limit for non-relativistic objects supported by ideal neutron degeneracy pressure is only 0.75 solar masses; however, with more realistic models including baryon interaction, the precise limit is unknown, as it depends on the equations of state of nuclear matter, for which a highly accurate model is not yet available. Above this limit, a neutron star may collapse into a black hole or into other possible dense forms of degenerate matter.

Proton degeneracy 

Sufficiently dense matter containing protons experiences proton degeneracy pressure, in a manner similar to the electron degeneracy pressure in electron-degenerate matter: protons confined to a sufficiently small volume have a large uncertainty in their momentum due to the Heisenberg uncertainty principle. However, because protons are much more massive than electrons, the same momentum represents a much smaller velocity for protons than for electrons. As a result, in matter with approximately equal numbers of protons and electrons, proton degeneracy pressure is much smaller than electron degeneracy pressure, and proton degeneracy is usually modeled as a correction to the equations of state of electron-degenerate matter.

Quark degeneracy 

At densities greater than those supported by neutron degeneracy, quark matter is expected to occur. Several variations of this hypothesis have been proposed that represent quark-degenerate states. Strange matter is a degenerate gas of quarks that is often assumed to contain strange quarks in addition to the usual up and down quarks. Color superconductor materials are degenerate gases of quarks in which quarks pair up in a manner similar to Cooper pairing in electrical superconductors. The equations of state for the various proposed forms of quark-degenerate matter vary widely, and are usually also poorly defined, due to the difficulty of modeling strong force interactions.

Quark-degenerate matter may occur in the cores of neutron stars, depending on the equations of state of neutron-degenerate matter. It may also occur in hypothetical quark stars, formed by the collapse of objects above the Tolman–Oppenheimer–Volkoff mass limit for neutron-degenerate objects. Whether quark-degenerate matter forms at all in these situations depends on the equations of state of both neutron-degenerate matter and quark-degenerate matter, both of which are poorly known. Quark stars are considered to be an intermediate category between neutron stars and black holes.

See also
 Degenerate energy levels
 Fermi liquid theory
 Gravitational time dilation
 Matter wave
 Metallic hydrogen

Notes

Citations

References

External links
 Detailed mathematical explanation of degenerate gases
 Mass-radius diagram of degenerate star types

Astrophysics
Degenerate stars
Exotic matter
Phases of matter